Martian Land is a 2015 direct-to-video science fiction action film directed by Scott Wheeler and starring Alan Pietruszewski, Lane Townsend and Jennifer Dorogi. It was made by The Asylum. In the tradition of The Asylum's catalog, Martian Land is a mockbuster of the film The Martian.

Plot

In the distant future, the human race has made Earth all but uninhabitable due to pollution, the eruption of the Yellowstone volcano, and misuse of the planet's resources. Now mankind lives on Mars, in cities that resemble those once found on Earth, and are protected from the alien environment by dome-like force-fields. When a  sandstorm of record intensity  breaks through the dome and destroys Mars New York, those in Mars Los Angeles must figure out how to stop the storm before it wipes them out next. The sandstorm's power was heightened due to the terra-forming efforts on Mars reactivating long dormant volcanoes.

Dr. Foster is sent from Earth to Mars Los Angeles, "MLA," to find a solution to stopping the storm from hitting the city, but is partnered with Neil, a pilot who is dating Foster's ex-wife Miranda. Dr. Foster is more interested in cleaning up Earth, and comes up with a last ditch plan to use EMF pulses to weaken the storm. Miranda. the lead researcher based on Mars, is distracted as their teenage daughter Ellie, is trapped in the tunnels beneath the ruins of Mars New York, "MNY," with her girlfriend/life partner, Ida. The two of them are trying to find a safe passage to MLA, as the series of tunnels that once connected the cities have been blocked or destroyed. Reiger is the military commander who feels that the scientist's response in inadequate to prevent loss of life.

Cast
 Alan Pietruszewski as Neil
 Lane Townsend as Foster
 Jennifer Dorogi as Miranda
 Arianna Afsar as Ellie
 Chloe Farnworth as Ida
 Dionne Neish as Reiger
 Eddy Owdish as Klaus
 Caroline Attwood as Dana
 James Wong as Bryce
 Chaim Dunbar as Andrews
 Dan Czerwonka as Carlos
 Caroline Williams as Ulyana

Reception

Radio Times gave the movie 2 out of 5 stars. The Movie Scene also gave the movie 2 out of 5 stars, noting that Lane Townsend's acting was the best part of the movie. Movie Mag found the premise of the movie intriguing, but found that the movie "screwed it up at every turn." Moria noted that while this movie used the same setting as The Martian, of which it is said the be a mockbuster, that the story was entirely different. Moria also notes that this movie works better than most of the Asylum's other movies, although the scientific accuracy of the movie is questionable.

References

External links
 Official site at The Asylum
 

2015 films
2015 direct-to-video films
2015 science fiction action films
2015 LGBT-related films
American science fiction action films
American LGBT-related films
The Asylum films
Direct-to-video science fiction films
LGBT-related science fiction films
Lesbian-related films
2010s English-language films
Mars in film
Films shot in California
2010s American films